Manuel Arancibia (25 May 1908 – 27 March 1987) was a Chilean footballer. He played in six matches for the Chile national football team from 1937 to 1942. He was also part of Chile's squad for the 1937 South American Championship.

References

External links
 

1908 births
1987 deaths
Chilean footballers
Chile international footballers
Place of birth missing
Association football forwards
Badminton F.C. footballers
Club de Deportes Green Cross footballers